Folkert de Jong (born 1972) is a Dutch artist. He makes large-scale sculpture and installations. 

De Jong was born in Egmond aan Zee in the Netherlands. De Jong’s installations are life-size representations of disturbing scenes including human figures and props formed from materials such as polyurethane and Styrofoam; his work often features the uncanny and takes influence from the aesthetics of horror and the history of conflict, war and politics.

Exhibitions 

Prix de Rome/Life's Illusions, 2004
Golden Dawn, Peres Projects, Los Angeles, 2005
Les Saltimbanques, James Cohan Gallery, New York, 2007
Circle of Trust: Selected Works 2001-2009, Groninger Museum, Groningen, 2009
Operation Harmony, James Cohan Gallery, New York, 2011
The Immortals, Glasgow International Festival of Visual Art, 2012
State of light, Louise Alexander Gallery, Porto Cervo, Italy, 2017
Retrospective, Museum of Contemporary Art, Tucson, Arizona, USA, 2018

Awards 

Prix de Rome, Sculpture, 2003
KDR KunstRAI Prize, Amsterdam, 2004

References

Further reading
Catriona Black, Go figure, Heraldscotland, 15 April 2012
Timothée Chaillou, Interview à Folkert de Jong, Dorade spring - summer 2012
Scott Indrisek, The Alchemist, Modern Painters, October 2011
Philippe Dagen, La sculpture n'est pas morte, c'est Saatchi qui le dit, Le Monde, 16 June 2011
Alastair Sooke, The future of sculpture - but with an eye on past masters, The Daily Telegraph, 2011
Jackie Wullschlager, Let's get physical, Financial Times, 2011
Nancy Durrant, The shape of things to come, The Times, 2011
Saskia van der Kroef, Folkert De Jong: Groninger Museum, Artforum, February 2010
S. van der Zijpp, Y. Tsitsovits, J. Declercq, Circle Of Trust - Folkert de Jong, selected works 2001-2009, Groninger Museum, Black Cat Publishing, Amsterdam 2009
M. Straus, C. Van Gerrewey, Double Dutch, Hudson Valley Center for Contemporary Art 2009
J. Breton, A. Ténèze, Picasso – Ses maîtres et ses héritiers, Beaux Art éditions, Paris 2008
M. LeBlanc, Folkert de Jong, Beautiful Decay, no. 5, 2008
M. Amy, Folkert de Jong – Confronting the Grotesque, Sculpture magazine vol. 27/5, June 2008
G. Volk, M. J. Straus, A. Finel Honigman, Folkert de Jong - Les Saltimbanques, James Cohan Gallery, Black Cat Publishing, Amsterdam 2007
K. Zijlmans, J. Dietvorst, S. Weyns, Folkert de Jong - Gott Mit Uns, Black Cat Publishing, Amsterdam 2006
S. Wallis, S. Lüttiken, M. van Nieuwenhuizen, Folkert de Jong - Shoot The Freak, NAI Publishers, Rotterdam 2005

1972 births
Living people
Dutch contemporary artists
Dutch installation artists
Dutch sculptors
Dutch male sculptors
Contemporary sculptors
People from Egmond
Prix de Rome (Netherlands) winners